The Line 6 of the Kunming Metro also known as Airport line is a rapid transit line that connects the Kunming Changshui International Airport with Kunming's urban center. The line is currently  in length with 8 stations.

The line entered into operation on 28 June 2012, and ceased operation temporarily beginning May 2016 in order to coordinate work related to the opening of Line 3 scheduled for early 2017. Finally it reopened in August 2017 along with Line 3.

On subway maps, the line's color is  teal.

Opening timeline

Fare
One-way fare costs CN¥5.

Hours of Operation
Currently the hours of operation for Line 6, from 6:00 AM to 22:00 PM daily. Frequency averages 15 minutes.

On the initial operation one-way trip will take approximately 20 minutes.

Route
Line 6 runs in Panlong District and Guandu District.

History
Construction of Line 6 began on 1 August 2010.  Track-laying was completed around December 2011. Line 6 opened to public operation on 28 June 2012 with two initial stations (East Coach Station and Kunming Airport), on the opening day of Kunming Changshui International Airport to serve the passengers from the new airport to downtown Kunming.

Gallery

References 

06
Railway lines opened in 2012
2012 establishments in China